Phyllium hausleithneri or Hausleithner's stick insect is a species of phasmid or leaf insect of the genus Phyllium. It is found in peninsular Malaysia, and Sri Lanka.

References

Phylliidae
Phasmatodea of Malesia
Insects described in 1859